Savita may refer to:

 Savitr, a Hindu deity associated with motion and the sun
 Savita Ambedkar (1909–2003), Indian social activist and doctor
 Savita Halappanavar, woman who died in Ireland after she was denied an abortion
 Savita Bhabhi, fictional pornographic cartoon character
 Savita Oil Technologies Limited or simply Savita, Indian industrial lubricant manufacturer

See also